Bruce McMillan (born 29 June 1942) is a New Zealand former sports shooter. He competed in the 25 metre pistol event at the 1972 Summer Olympics.

References

1942 births
Living people
New Zealand male sport shooters
Olympic shooters of New Zealand
Shooters at the 1972 Summer Olympics
Sportspeople from Lower Hutt
Commonwealth Games medallists in shooting
Commonwealth Games bronze medallists for New Zealand
Shooters at the 1974 British Commonwealth Games
Medallists at the 1974 British Commonwealth Games